Murray Schwartz (August 14, 1919 – October 5, 2001) was an American businessman and politician from New York.

Life
He was born on August 14, 1919, in Brooklyn, New York City. He engaged in the distribution of heating oil, and owned several travel agencies. He married Jeanette Jay, and they had two children. They lived in Queens. He entered politics as a Democrat.

He was a member of the New York State Senate from 1966 to 1972, sitting in the 176th, 177th, 178th and 179th New York State Legislatures.

He was New York City Commissioner of Commerce and Industry from 1974 to 1975.

He died on October 5, 2001, at his summer home in Roslyn, New York.

Songwriter Jack Lawrence (1912–2009) was his brother.

Sources

1919 births
2001 deaths
People from Queens, New York
Democratic Party New York (state) state senators
20th-century American politicians